The following highways are numbered 698:

Canada

United States